In Heat may refer to:

Estrous cycle in animals (usually referred to as "in heat")
In Heat (Love Unlimited album) (1974)
In Heat (The Romantics album) (1983)
In Heat (Black 'N Blue album) (1988)
In Heat (Fuzztones album), 1989
"In Heat" (Criminal Minds), an episode of the U.S. TV series Criminal Minds
"In Heat", an episode of Broad City